The Roman Catholic Diocese of Huacho is a diocese located in the city of Huacho in the Ecclesiastical province of Lima in Peru.

History
15 May 1958: Established as Diocese of Huacho from the Metropolitan Archdiocese of Lima

Ordinaries
Nemesio Rivera Meza (15 May 1958 – 28 January 1960), appointed Bishop of Cajamarca
Pablo Ramírez Taboado, SS.CC. (28 January 1960 – 19 December 1966)
Lorenzo León Alvarado (3 August 1967 – 22 April 2003)
Antonio Santarsiero Rosa, O.S.I. (since 4 February 2004)

See also
Roman Catholicism in Peru

Sources
 GCatholic.org
 Catholic Hierarchy
  Diocese website 

Roman Catholic dioceses in Peru
Roman Catholic Ecclesiastical Province of Lima
Christian organizations established in 1958
Roman Catholic dioceses and prelatures established in the 20th century
1958 establishments in Peru